Luigi Marchisio (26 April 1909 – 3 July 1992) was an Italian professional road racing cyclist.

Marchisio was born at Castelnuovo, Piedmont. The highlight of his career was his overall win in the 1930 Giro d'Italia, the youngest victor ever at the time (he was beat only by Fausto Coppi's victory in 1940). Marchisio was also 3rd in the  1931 Giro d'Italia, but subsequently he failed to achieve any result of note. He retired in 1936.

Marchisio died in 1992.

1909 births
1992 deaths
People from Castelnuovo Don Bosco
Italian male cyclists
Giro d'Italia winners
Cyclists from Piedmont
Sportspeople from the Province of Asti